Herdi Bernard Boloko Bukusu (born 3 April 2000) is a German professional footballer who plays as a forward for Bremer SV.

International career
Born in Germany, Bukusu is of Angolan descent. He has represented Germany at youth international level.

Personal life
He is the brother of fellow professional footballer Kevin Bukusu.

Career statistics

Notes

References

2000 births
Living people
German people of Angolan descent
Sportspeople from Aachen
German footballers
Footballers from North Rhine-Westphalia
Association football forwards
Germany youth international footballers
Alemannia Aachen players
Bayer 04 Leverkusen players
Hamburger SV players
Hamburger SV II players
R.E. Virton players
Bremer SV players
Regionalliga players
Challenger Pro League players
German expatriate footballers
Angolan expatriate footballers
German expatriate sportspeople in Belgium
Angolan expatriate sportspeople in Belgium
Expatriate footballers in Belgium